Stuart Farquhar (born 15 March 1982 in Te Aroha, Thames Valley) is a male javelin thrower from New Zealand. He was the silver medallist in the men's javelin at the 2010 Commonwealth Games.

Farquhar is a twelve time New Zealand National Javelin Champion. In April 2012 he recorded a new personal best of 86.31 metres in Hiroshima, Japan.

He finished sixth at the 2006 IAAF World Cup. He competed at the 2004 Summer Olympics without reaching the final. He improved on his previous Olympic result by finishing 20th at the 2008 Summer Olympics in Beijing, China.

Farquhar finished 9th in the men's javelin final at the 2012 Summer Olympics with a throw of 80.22 metres.

Achievements

Seasonal bests by year
1998 – 63.82
2000 – 72.22
2002 – 78.51
2003 – 76.41
2004 – 79.68
2005 – 72.14
2006 – 81.70
2007 – 78.08
2008 – 83.23
2009 – 80.16
2010 – 85.35
2011 – 84.21
2012 – 86.31
2013 – 81.07
2014 – 79.69
2015 – 82.75
2016 – 83.93

References

External links

2006 Commonwealth Games profile

1982 births
Living people
New Zealand male javelin throwers
Commonwealth Games silver medallists for New Zealand
Athletes (track and field) at the 2004 Summer Olympics
Athletes (track and field) at the 2006 Commonwealth Games
Athletes (track and field) at the 2008 Summer Olympics
Athletes (track and field) at the 2010 Commonwealth Games
Athletes (track and field) at the 2012 Summer Olympics
Athletes (track and field) at the 2014 Commonwealth Games
Olympic athletes of New Zealand
Sportspeople from Te Aroha
World Athletics Championships athletes for New Zealand
Athletes (track and field) at the 2016 Summer Olympics
Commonwealth Games medallists in athletics
Universiade medalists in athletics (track and field)
Universiade silver medalists for New Zealand
Medalists at the 2009 Summer Universiade
Medallists at the 2010 Commonwealth Games